Maestro is a 2005 Hungarian computer-animated short film written, produced and directed by Géza M. Tóth. It won the Amaryllis Tamás Award at the 7th Kecskemét Animation Film Festival, and was nominated for Best Animated Short Film at the 79th Academy Awards in 2007. Composer Attila Pacsay wrote the film's music.

The film depicts the minutes before a "maestro"'s show and his preparation for it as aided by a mechanical assistant. It is noted for its use of CGI technology and surprise ending.

References

External links
 

2005 films
2005 short films
2005 computer-animated films
2000s animated short films
Computer-animated short films
Hungarian animated short films